Mattie Midgett Store and House, also known as Nellie Myrtle Pridgen's Beachcomber Museum, is a historic home and general store located at Nags Head, Dare County, North Carolina.  The store was built in 1914, and the house in 1933. The store is a two-story frame Outer Banks Shingle Style building with a hipped shingle roof. A one-story, hipped-roof, one-room addition was built in 1944. The store was moved to its present site in 1932.  The house is a two-story, T -shaped, single-pile frame dwelling with steeply pitched gable roofs.

The store houses the Outer Banks Beachcomber Museum, which features a collection of beach glass, feathers, shells, sand, bricks and bottles found on area beaches.

It was listed on the National Register of Historic Places in 2004.

References

Commercial buildings on the National Register of Historic Places in North Carolina
Houses on the National Register of Historic Places in North Carolina
Shingle Style architecture in North Carolina
Houses completed in 1933
Commercial buildings completed in 1914
Museums in Dare County, North Carolina
Houses in Dare County, North Carolina
National Register of Historic Places in Dare County, North Carolina
1914 establishments in North Carolina